Miljan Zeković (Cyrillic: Миљан Зековић; 15 November 1925 – 10 December 1993) was a Montenegrin and Yugoslav football player and manager.

Playing career

Club
He played for FK Sutjeska Nikšić and FK Budućnost Titograd before coming, in 1951, to become one of the memorable left-backs in Red Star Belgrade, where he will play until 1960, winning four National Championships, in 1952-53, 1955-56, 1956-57 and 1958-59, and two Cups, in 1958 and 1959. After leaving the Belgrade club, he played one season as striker with NK Čelik Zenica, before joining Bernard Vukas in Austrian Bundesliga club Grazer AK where he played three seasons, until 1965.

International
He played a total of 13 matches for the Yugoslavia national football team. His debut was on September 21, 1952, in Belgrade against Austria, a 4–2 win, and his fairway match was on November 11, 1955, in Paris against France, a 1–1 draw.

Managerial career
After retiring as a player, he worked one season as a coach with FK Dubočica, before leaving to Greece where he worked for six clubs in eight years.

References

External links
 Profile at Serbian Federation site

1925 births
1993 deaths
Footballers from Nikšić
Association football fullbacks
Yugoslav footballers
Yugoslavia international footballers
1954 FIFA World Cup players
FK Sutjeska Nikšić players
FK Budućnost Podgorica players
Red Star Belgrade footballers
NK Čelik Zenica players
Grazer AK players
Yugoslav First League players
Austrian Football Bundesliga players
Yugoslav expatriate footballers
Expatriate footballers in Austria
Yugoslav expatriate sportspeople in Austria
Yugoslav football managers
Ethnikos Piraeus F.C. managers
Veria F.C. managers
Kalamata F.C. managers
Panserraikos F.C. managers
Pierikos F.C. managers
Panetolikos F.C. managers
Yugoslav expatriate football managers
Expatriate football managers in Greece
Yugoslav expatriate sportspeople in Greece